Africa–North Korea relations refers to the diplomatic  relations between the Democratic People's Republic of Korea (North Korea) and the continent of Africa. Many African nations maintain a close relationship with North Korea, despite United Nations sanctions on North Korea.

Art and culture
As part of their efforts to attain widespread diplomatic recognition, the North Korean government established the Mansudae Overseas Projects as a subsidiary of its Mansudae Art Studio. From its inception to the modern day, Mansudae Overseas has created monuments, sculptures, and government facilities in the style of socialist realism. Although many of its initial works were given freely as diplomatic gestures, especially in Africa, Mansudae Overseas began charging for its construction following the dissolution of the Soviet Union and the subsequent end of Soviet financial assistance. Due in part to this history of artistic diplomacy, African nations continue to represent most of Mansudae Overseas' customers. Mansudae Overseas Projects built the African Renaissance Monument in Senegal, which is the tallest statue in Africa. In Mozambique, a street named after Kim il-Sung can be found in the capital Maputo. In Namibia's national museum, a black-and-white picture of a North Korean soldier leading a group of local soldiers hangs in the foyer.

History

Cold War and Decolonization of Africa
During the Cold War, North Korea joined the Third World and the Eastern Bloc (especially China, Cuba, and the Soviet Union) in condemning European colonialism in Africa and providing support to revolutionary and anti-colonial movements across the continent. They provided several military and civil assistance programs to some of Africa's more radical states, including Guinea, Ethiopia, Zimbabwe, Mali, and Tanzania. In return, North Korea was able to gain diplomatic recognition and other leverage; they were successful in ensuring South Korea was unable to join the Non-Aligned Movement. In Egypt's case, the relationship was especially close; North Korean pilots flew Egyptian fighters in the 1973 Yom Kippur War and Egypt exported to North Korea scud missiles.  Egypt even had diplomatic relations established with Israel before it had relations with South Korea.

Rhodesian Bush War
During the Rhodesian Bush War, North Korea opposed the white-ruled government of Rhodesia (now Zimbabwe) and supported the black African guerrilla fighters, alongside China and the Soviet Union. Soldiers of the Zimbabwe African National Union were invited to a hidden camp near Pyongyang, where North Korean military officers trained them with explosives. After Rhodesia became Zimbabwe in 1980, North Korea maintained an alliance with Zimbabwean president Robert Mugabe.

Apartheid in South Africa
North Korea strongly condemned apartheid in South Africa and refused to establish any diplomatic relations with the apartheid regime.  When North Korea opened up for foreign tourists in 1986, it banned citizens of South Africa from entry (along with citizens of Japan, the United States, and Israel). 
Militants affiliated with the African National Congress received training from North Korean agents in camps hidden inside Angola.  Diplomatic relations between the two nations were established in 1998, after the end of apartheid. After the death of Nelson Mandela in 2013, Chairman of the Presidium of the Supreme People's Assembly Kim Yong-nam expressed condolences on behalf of Supreme Leader Kim Jong-un, and praised Mandela's "struggle against racism and for democracy".

Angolan Civil War
North Korea has had a strong relationship with Angola from the time of Angola's struggle for independence. It is estimated that 3,000 North Korean troops and a thousand advisers took part in the Angolan Civil War in the 1970s and 1980s, supporting the communist MPLA and fighting against the apartheid South African military.

Mozambican Civil War
After Mozambique gained its independence from Portugal in a revolution, it fell into a civil war between the communist FRELIMO and the anti-communist RENAMO. North Korea established a military mission in Mozambique during the early 1980s to support FRELIMO. North Korean advisers were instrumental in the formation of FRELIMO's first specialized counter-insurgency brigade, which was deployed from 1983 onward. Furthermore, the GDR has provided military assistance and training to members of the Mozambican FPLM in the GDR.

Zanzibar Revolution
After the black African rebels overthrew the ruling Arab monarchy of Zanzibar, North Korea received immediate recognition from the People's Republic of Zanzibar and Pemba.

South African Border War
During the South African Border War, SWAPO formed The South West African Liberation Army - an insurgency against the South African government. SWLA rebels traveled to North Korea for military training.

Trade
Trade between North Korea and African nations is estimated to be worth US$100 million. This is a significant amount of money for North Korea due to foreign sanctions. North Korean deployed a team in 1978 and 1979, to help start up Asian carp-based aquaculture in Rwanda.  Japanese prime minister Shinzo Abe has called for pressure on African nations to reduce their trade with North Korea.

Military

The Gambia
North Korea dispatched a team of karate martial arts instructors to provide the military of the Gambia with self-defense training.

Nigeria
North Korea offered ballistic missile assistance to Nigeria after a meeting with Nigerian vice president Atiku Abubakar and Yang Hyong-sop, the Chairman of the Supreme People's Assembly of North Korea.

Uganda
Uganda is a long-term ally of North Korea. Yoweri Museveni, Uganda's president since 1986, has said that he learned basic Korean from Kim Il-sung during visits to North Korea. North Korea has provided training for pilots, technicians, police, marine forces, and special forces. In 2016 Uganda stated that it was ending this cooperation due to United Nations sanctions against North Korea's nuclear weapons program. Uganda indicated, however, that it still considered North Korea to be a friend.

Zimbabwe
Soldiers of the Zimbabwean African National Liberation Army were trained in North Korea during the Rhodesian Bush War. In 1980, after independence was gained and Rhodesia became Zimbabwe, the new Zimbabwean President Robert Mugabe visited North Korea. In October 1980, Kim Il-sung and Mugabe signed an agreement for an exchange of soldiers. Following this agreement, 106 North Korean soldiers arrived in Zimbabwe to train a brigade of soldiers that became known as the Fifth Brigade.

References

Sources
 

Foreign relations of Africa
Foreign relations of North Korea